Events from the year 1783 in Russia

Incumbents
 Monarch – Catherine II

Events
 Annexation of Crimea by the Russian Empire
 Black Sea Fleet founded
 Bolshoi Theatre, Saint Petersburg first built
 Church of St. Catherine (Saint Petersburg) completed
 Kuban Nogai Uprising
 Malo-Kalinkin Bridge (St. Petersburg) built
 Mariinsky Theatre Orchestra founded
 Russian Academy founded
 Sevastopol Naval Base completed
 Treaty of Georgievsk - Georgian kingdom of Kartli-Kakheti becomes a Russian protectorate
 Vladimir Central Prison founded

Births
 Catherine Bagration - princess known for eccentric life abroad
 Andrej Dudrovich - philosopher, president of Kharkov University
 Nadezhda Durova - soldier
 Alexander Ivanovich Galich - philosopher and writer
 Paisi Kaysarov - general
 Pyotr Kozlovsky - diplomat and writer
 Louis Alexandre Andrault de Langeron - French emigre, general
 Grand Duchess Alexandra Pavlovna of Russia - daughter of Paul I of Russia
 Alexander Sablukov - general, inventor
 Fyodor Shubin - soldier, founder of Nur-Sultan
 Fyodor Petrovich Tolstoy - artist
 Friedrich Caspar von Geismar - Austrian-German who became Russian general
 Friedrich von Rüdiger - general
 Vasily Zhukovsky - poet, imperial tutor

Deaths
 Alexander Ablesimov - writer
 Alexander Mikhailovich Golitsyn - general and statesman
 Gerhard Friedrich Müller - ethnographer and historian
 Grigory Orlov - favorite of Catherine the Great
 Nikita Ivanovich Panin - advisor to Catherine the Great
 Tikhon of Zadonsk - bishop, writer, saint

References

1783 in Russia
Years of the 18th century in the Russian Empire